Rent-A-Wreck is an American car rental company renting vehicles that have been previously owned by individuals or other rental car companies. They are also known for accommodating younger drivers and those with poor or no credit.

The company's trademark phrases are 'The Smart Alternative' and 'Don't Let The Name Fool You!', the latter referring to how the vehicles in their rental fleet are not "wrecks".

History 

Rent-A-Wreck was founded in 1968 in Los Angeles and sold its first franchise in 1973. Since then, it has opened franchised locations in 41 of the 50 U.S. states, Scandinavia, and Sint Maarten island in the Caribbean. The company operates primarily in neighborhood locations, often connected to or in close proximity to repair facilities, car dealerships or other automotive related services. Some Rent-A-Wreck locations offer airport pick-up and drop off.

Rent-A-Wreck was purchased by JJF Management on January 26, 2006. Long time employee, Jason Maneli, was made President of Rent-A-Wreck in July 2018.

International expansion

A separate Calgary-based Rent-A-Wreck was founded in 1976 in Prince George, BC and not affiliated with the US based firm (changed parent firm from Rent-A-Wreck Capital, Incorporated to Franchise Services of North America, Incorporated). This firm offers car and truck rentals in all 10 provinces and the Yukon Territory.  This Canadian operation is known as PractiCar since 2008.

References

External links
 

Car rental companies of the United States
American companies established in 1968
Retail companies established in 1968
Transport companies established in 1968
1968 establishments in California